The Seminary of the Immaculate Conception was a Catholic seminary in Lloyd Harbor, New York, accredited by the Association of Theological Schools in the United States and Canada, and serving the Diocese of Rockville Centre. It offered a number of academic degrees, primarily those of Master of Divinity (M.Div.) and Doctor of Ministry (D.Min.).

History
The seminary was founded in 1926 in a house in Lloyd Harbor acquired by Thomas E. Molloy, Bishop of the Diocese of Brooklyn, which at that time covered all of Long Island. It was an expansion of the original school, St. John's Seminary, located in Brooklyn and staffed by the priests of the Congregation of the Mission as a part of their historic commitment to the education of the clergy of the Catholic Church. It began with 25 students studying at the collegiate level. The construction of the new building to house the seminary was completed in 1930 and classes were offered there in September of that year. The student body at that point was 85 seminarians in the two-year college level and the school of theology.

Due to the expanding population in the suburban counties of Nassau and Suffolk, in 1957 the Holy See separated them from the Diocese of Brooklyn and established the Diocese of Rockville Centre to serve them. The two dioceses agreed to share operation of the seminary. Ten years later the college level segment of the school was discontinued. With the changing needs of ministry in the Catholic Church in the following decades, new programs and degrees began to be offered. In 2012, the seminary program was closed. The facility today is used as a retreat house by seminaries, Catholic schools and colleges and other Catholic groups such as the Knights of Columbus, etc.

Seminarian program end
In November 2011, it was announced that the seminary would stop training new priests as of September 2012. Instead, the Diocese of Rockville Centre merged their seminary program with the Diocese of Brooklyn and the Archdiocese of New York at St. Joseph's Seminary in Yonkers.  , the seminary continues to offer theological courses (including master's degrees) to the general public.

Protestant and Orthodox usage 
The seminary has hosted retreats for protestant as well as Eastern Orthodox churches in Nassau and Suffolk after the end of the seminarian program.

Library 
The seminarian library continued to operate after the end of the Seminarian Theology program. The library houses Catholic, Protestant, and theological texts and contains their own private archive of rare books. However, it was announced on December 16, 2020 that the library would be closing its doors.

References

External links
 Official website

Catholic seminaries in the United States
Seminaries and theological colleges in New York (state)
Educational institutions established in 1928
1928 establishments in New York (state)
Educational institutions disestablished in 2012
2012 disestablishments in New York (state)